Hopewell Village (also, Hopewell Cross Roads) is an unincorporated community in Harford County, Maryland, United States. It lies at an elevation of 449 feet (137 m).

References

Unincorporated communities in Harford County, Maryland
Unincorporated communities in Maryland